A clochán (plural clocháin) or beehive hut is a dry-stone hut with a corbelled roof, commonly associated with the south-western Irish seaboard. The precise construction date of most of these structures is unknown with the buildings belonging to a long-established Celtic tradition, though there is at present no direct evidence to date the surviving examples before . Some associated with religious sites may be pre-Romanesque, some consider that the most fully intact structures date after the 12th century or later. It is where monks lived.

Form
They are most commonly round beehive huts, but rectangular plans are known as well. It has been suggested that the rectangular footprints date to a later era. Some clochán are not completely built of stone and may have possessed a thatched roof. Sometimes several clochans are joined together by their walls.

Locations
Clochán are mainly found in the Southwest of Ireland, for example at Skellig Michael, Church Island off Beginish Island, Glanfahan, Fahan and Reask in the Dingle Peninsula of County Kerry. Many occur in religious contexts such as used by the monks following Saint Patrick; moreover, his successors carried on the architectural tradition in the Scottish island of Iona and eventually via Aidan to the eastern English islands of Farne and Holy Island. There are others in ringforts (such as Leacanabuaile, County Kerry) that are commonly interpreted as secular dwellings. Elaborate dry walled stone churches like the Gallarus Oratory may derive from the clochán. The clochán has been described in the 7th to 8th-century law Críth Gablach.

Popular culture
Parts of the 2017 film Star Wars: The Last Jedi were filmed using the beehive huts on the island of Skellig Michael. Because of the restrictions regarding filming on the island, a set of replica beehive huts were also built in 2016 at Ceann Sibéal, near Ballyferriter, on the Dingle Peninsula.

See also
Beehive house
Christian monasticism
Chysauster Romano-British settlement in southwest Britain
Cleit
Dry stone
Hermits
Vernacular architecture

Further reading
 Olsen, B. (2003) Sacred Places North America, Santa Cruz, California: CCC Publishing
 Edwards, Nancy (1990) The Archaeology of Early Medieval Ireland, London: Batsford
 Aalen, F. H. A. (1964) Clochans as Transhumance Dwellings in the Dingle Peninsula, Co. Kerry
 Henry, Françoise (1948) Early Irish Monasteries, Boat-Shaped Oratories and Beehive Huts
 Henry, Françoise (1956/1957) Early Monasteries, Beehive Huts, and Dry-Stone Houses in the Neighbourhood of Caherciveen and Waterville (Co. Kerry)
 Peter Harbison (1970), "How old is Gallarus oratory? A reappraisal of its role in early Irish architecture", Medieval Archeology, Vol. XIV, pp. 34–59

References

External links

Stone houses
Buildings and structures in Ireland
Vernacular architecture
Roofing materials
Irish Christian monks
Monasticism
Archaeological sites in County Kerry
Ruins in the Republic of Ireland
Christian monasteries in the Republic of Ireland